The Secrets of the Black Arts is the debut album by Dark Funeral, released on 28 January 1996, by No Fashion Records. It was re-released on 31 July 2007, with a bonus disc consisting of the album original recording (digitally re-mixed in April 2007). The Secrets of the Black Arts is the only album to feature guitarist Blackmoon, vocalist/bassist Themgoroth and drummer Equimanthorn.

The original recording (15–21 January 1995) was produced by Dan Swanö at Unisound Studios. According to Blackmoon, he insisted that they re-record the album due to "severely unprofessional production and manner from Mr. Swanö". He continued, "He was overworked and mentally tired when we came to the studio. Also, our then-drummer was not playing as good as he should have. So it ended up crap." The rest of the band was satisfied with the recording, but Blackmoon refused to release the album with that recording. They decided on The Abyss Studio and recorded the album that was eventually released to the public.

A music video was shot for "The Secrets of the Black Arts".

Track listing
Writing by Dark Funeral except where noted.

Personnel

Dark Funeral
Themgoroth – vocals, bass guitar
Blackmoon – guitar, vocals on "Satanic Blood"
Lord Ahriman – guitar
Equimanthorn – drums

References

External links
 Lyrics at official website

1996 debut albums
Dark Funeral albums
Albums produced by Peter Tägtgren
Albums with cover art by Kristian Wåhlin